Chemquasabamticook Lake (or Ross Lake) is the source of Chemquasabamticook Stream in the North Maine Woods. The lake is in Maine townships 9 and 10 of range 15, and township 9 of range 14. Tributaries include Sweeney Brook, Boucher Brook, Gannet Brook, Fool Brook, and Ross Inlet. Chemquasabamticook Stream flows  from a disused dam at the north end of the lake to reach Long Lake on the Allagash River. Chemquasabamticook Lake has a self-sustaining native squaretail population, and rainbow smelt have been introduced to encourage more rapid growth of the native togue.

Sources

Lakes of Piscataquis County, Maine
North Maine Woods
Saint John River (Bay of Fundy)
Lakes of Maine